Maximilian Robertson (born 27 December 1963) is a male English former track and field athlete who competed in the 400 metres hurdles. He got a ticket on the plane to represent Great Britain at the 1988 Olympic Games and the 1992 Olympic Games. He also won a silver medal at the 1986 Commonwealth Games. He won five AAA Championships titles and four UK Championship titles.

Career
Robertson was born in Weymouth, Dorset, England. He finished second to Ahmed Hamada of Burundi at the 1985 AAA Championships in 50.16 secs, and in his first season running below 50 seconds, he achieved his season's best with 49.75 on 30 August 1985 in Budapest, to be the second ranked 400 metres hurdler in the UK behind Mark Holtom. He would go on to rank in the UK top three for eight consecutive seasons (1985-1992).

Robertson won both the UK Championships and AAA Championships titles in 1986, running a personal best of 49.53 at the latter. At the Commonwealth Games in Edinburgh, he won the silver medal for England in a time of 49.77, behind Phil Beattie of Northern Ireland. At the European Championships in Stuttgart, he reached the semi-finals, running 50.06.

Robertson retained both the UK and AAAs titles in 1987. He tied with Kriss Akabusi (in Akabusi's first season at 400m hurdles) at the  UK Championships in 49.56, before winning the AAA Championship title in 49.51. At the World Championships in Rome, he ran 49.73 to reach the semi-finals, where he was eliminated in 49.90. 1987 also saw him improve his personal best to 49.35.

Robertson won his third AAA title at the 1988 AAA Championships/Olympic trials in 50.23 secs, earning Olympic selection. At the Seoul Olympics, he was eliminated in the heats with 50.67. 1989 saw him win his third UK title and fourth AAAs title.

Robertson reached his peak at the 1990European Championships in Split, running his lifetime best of 49.25 in the semi-finals, to miss the final by just one-one hundredth of a second. He won his fourth UK title and fifth AAA title in 1991, running a season's best of 49.97 at the AAA. Forced out of the 1991 World Championships through injury, he concluded his international career by competing at the 1992 Barcelona Olympics, where he failed to finish in the heats.

Personal life

Robertson has two daughters; Clara Rose (Feb 1999) and Eleanor Jayne (Oct 2001).

Competition record

References

External links

1963 births
Living people
Athletes (track and field) at the 1986 Commonwealth Games
Athletes (track and field) at the 1988 Summer Olympics
Athletes (track and field) at the 1992 Summer Olympics
Commonwealth Games medallists in athletics
Commonwealth Games silver medallists for England
English male hurdlers
Olympic athletes of Great Britain
Sportspeople from Weymouth
Medallists at the 1986 Commonwealth Games